The Kansas City Police Station Number 4 in Kansas City, Missouri, was built in 1916. It was listed on the National Register of Historic Places in 2005.

It was designed by architects Clarence K. Birdsall and Edgar P. Madorie in Mission Revival style.

It has also been known as Kansas City Elevator Manufacturing Company, as Tood Jack Co., as Turner Elevator Manufacturing Co., and as Works Progress Administration Office.

References

Government buildings completed in 1916
Infrastructure completed in 1916
Buildings and structures in Kansas City, Missouri
Police stations in the United States
Police stations on the National Register of Historic Places
National Register of Historic Places in Kansas City, Missouri
Mission Revival architecture in Missouri